Mohammad Aghazadeh Khorasani (born 1877 in Najaf, Iran) was a Shia cleric from Iran, known for his scientific work published under pseudonyms such as Ayatollah Aghazadeh, Ayatollah Aghazadeh Najafi, or Ayatollah Aghazadeh Khorasani.

Biography 
At 30 years old, he attended master classes in the holy city of Najaf and, later, at the order of his father, moved to Mashhad. 

He lived in Najaf for several years, where he studied among religious scholars, including Mohammad-Kazem Khorasani. He then moved back to Mashhad to teach jurisprudence. The most notable of his students were Mojtaba Qazvin, his brother Sheikh Hashem Qazvin, and Hadi Kadkani. 

During the years he lived in Mashhad, in addition to political activities, teaching, and training students in his field, Khoransi was the head of the Khorasan Seminary.

Political activity 
Some of his activities:
 Opposition to the reign of Reza Shah
 Supporting the ulamas' opposition to the regime and its policies
 Criticizing the government for borrowing from foreign governments
 Dealing with the Democratic Party of Mashhad
 Involved with the Goharshad Mosque uprising that led to Reza Shah's exile in Yazd
He was sentenced to death by a military court for the compulsory residence in Tehran and provoking protests among Iraqi Scholars.

Death 
Khorasani died in 1937 in Rey, Iran, and his body was buried in the Shah-Abdol-Azim shrine in the garden of Parrot.

See also 
 Iranian Constitutional Revolution 
 Intellectual movements in Iran
 Mirza Malkom Khan
 Mirza Hussein Naini

References 

People from Najaf
1877 births
1937 deaths
Pupils of Muhammad Kadhim Khorasani